Whole Lotta Red is the second studio album by American rapper Playboi Carti. It was released on December 25, 2020, by Interscope Records as well as ASAP Rocky's AWGE label. Work on the album commenced in late 2018 and concluded in November 2020. The album consists of 24 tracks and features guest appearances from Kanye West, Kid Cudi, and Future. The album was executive produced by West, who also appears on the song "Go2DaMoon". Production was also handled by Carti's frequent collaborator and producer Pi'erre Bourne, along with Maaly Raw, Wheezy and F1lthy, among others.

Whole Lotta Red received mostly positive reviews from music critics. The album debuted atop the US Billboard 200, earning 100,000 album-equivalent units of which 10,000 were pure sales, becoming Carti's first US number-one album.

Background and release
In August 2018, following the release of Carti's debut studio album, Die Lit, a video surfaced of him discussing his next album and calling it Whole Lotta Red. In November, he performed unreleased songs at a concert in Seattle. In March 2019, during an interview with GQ, Carti said that Virgil Abloh would be the album's creative director. In May 2019, he featured on "Earfquake", the lead single of Igor by Tyler, the Creator with fans noting his "baby voice". Later that month, a song titled "Pissy Pamper" with Young Nudy leaked and went viral on social media platform TikTok. "Pissy Pamper" also reached number one on Spotify's US Viral 50 before being removed. Several other songs would go on to leak via YouTube and SoundCloud as well, reportedly causing Carti to remake the album. In June 2019, he revealed in an interview with The Fader that he began recording Whole Lotta Red towards the end of 2018, recording at DJ Drama's Means Street Studios in Atlanta and at his own home.

On April 14, 2020, Carti tweeted the cover to "@ Meh", which was released as a single two days later. The song was noted for Carti's usage of the aforementioned "baby voice". In May, Carti was featured on the track "Pain 1993", from Drake's mixtape, Dark Lane Demo Tapes, which continued his use of the "baby voice" and became his first top ten hit on the US Billboard Hot 100, peaking at number seven on the chart.

On November 23, following a social media hiatus, Carti posted on his socials, blurry photos of himself, while revealing that the album was turned in to his label. The same day, in a GQ profile, he called the album "alternative" and "psyched out". In the following days, Carti announced collaborations with several other rappers including Kanye West, Kid Cudi, Travis Scott, and Future. He also tweeted at Post Malone and Pharrell Williams. DJ Akademiks posted on Twitter and mentioned on a livestream that the album was to be released Christmas Day and would be executive produced by Kanye West; he mentions in both the stream and Twitter that he "nearly sold his soul" to obtain said information.

On December 21, Carti announced the cover art, release date, and pre-orders for merchandise on his social media accounts. The album was executively produced by Kanye West. It was the highly anticipated follow up to Die Lit.

Composition
Whole Lotta Red sees Playboi Carti showcase "a unique depth that has developed since the release of Die Lit", with him minimizing the use of his "baby voice". Instead, as noted by Hypebeast's Nicolaus Li, the album contains a "frenetic vocal styling that... defines Whole Lotta Red". Latesha Harris of NPR also noted how Carti trades in his baby cadences for a more aggressive sound, as he "continues with his signature unearthly sound. He opts out of being a traditional lyricist and instead acts a conductor of fun. His bars bounce among synthy, fractured beats from various producers [...], the end result showcasing how comfortable he is toeing the line between riveting and repetitive". The album features production by Pi'erre Bourne, Art Dealer, Outtatown, Star Boy, F1lthy, Juberlee, Richie Souf, Maaly Raw, and Wheezy, among others, all of whom help deliver a contemporary trap sound.

Artwork and aesthetic
On December 22, 2020, Carti announced the cover art for Whole Lotta Red via social media. It was designed by Jung "Art Dealer" Chung. The cover is a black and white image of Carti with a white outline and the word Red in large red letters on the top of the cover. The cover is based on and pays homage to a cover of late 70s punk-rock magazine Slash; featuring David Vanian of the Damned. On the left side of the cover, next to the parental advisory label, it reads "Volume One Number One" Of Red", the fictional magazine from Carti's Opium imprint. The album's imagery and merchandise designs have been noticed by journalists to be drawn from heavy metal imagery. Carti portrays himself as a vampire rock star in the album and uses his signature "baby voice" throughout the album.

Promotion
On April 16, 2020, the album's expected lead single, "@ Meh", was released. The song peaked at number 35 on the US Billboard Hot 100, where it became his second top 40 entry on the chart as a lead artist. Its music video debuted on the same day as the song's release, and was directed by Carti himself and Nick Walker.

On December 25, 2020, on the album's release date, a music video for the track "M3tamorphosis" featuring Kid Cudi was released. It was directed by Nico Ballesteros.

Critical reception

Whole Lotta Red was met with generally positive reviews. At Metacritic, which assigns a normalized rating out of 100 to reviews from professional publications, the album received an average score of 75, based on seven reviews, indicating "generally favorable reviews". Aggregator AnyDecentMusic? gave it 6.6 out of 10, based on their assessment of the critical consensus.

Fred Thomas reviewed the album for AllMusic, lauding the "blown-out instrumentals" and "demonic vocal performances". Paul A. Thompson of Pitchfork described Whole Lotta Red as "both wildly innovative and strikingly consistent", praising the "bright and serrated beats" and Carti's "soutré, expressive" vocals. Danny Schwartz from Rolling Stone enjoyed the album, saying, "Playboi Carti—Gen Z's answer to Nosferatu—performs emotions, toggles between them, and disguises them with a disquieting ease. He has never been more enigmatic". Reviewing the album for PopMatters, Semassa Boko stated, "Whole Lotta Red demonstrates Playboi Carti's commitment to dynamic growth and experimentation. However, it's painfully apparent that Carti needs more features". Colin Dempsey of Spectrum Culture praised the album, stating, "Carti comes into his own by stepping into the coffin of a vampire, scoffing at every critique tossed towards his vaudeville fangs". Vivian Medithi of HipHopDX said, "Semi-automatic dracos are made in Romania and Dracula was too. Whole Lotta Red is the sound of a new legend dying to be born. It'll be album of the year in 2022".

In a mixed review, NMEs Kyann-Sian Williams said, "Initially, you might be disappointed to have waited two years for what at first sounds like an underworked collection of throwaways. In places, though, the record rewards repeat listens. [...] But there's no getting away from the fact that at 24 tracks long, there's not a lot of variety on 'Whole Lotta Red', and the biggest take away here is perhaps that perennial rap fan favourite: less is most definitely more". In a negative review, Beats Per Minutes Mimi Kenny stated: "Whole Lotta Red has a vibe the same way a TGI Fridays has an atmosphere; it just rides a wave of different shades of lifeless trap, an endless TikTok dance in purgatory. [...] The problem is Whole Lotta Red hardly ever gives Carti a chance to be real. He puts on vapid personas like 'rock star' and 'vampire' like he's at Halloween Express. Tracks are Seinfeldian in their nothingness." Veteran critic Robert Christgau highlighted "Rockstar Mode" and "Punk Mode" while conceding that Playboi Carti "sounds like nobody else", but concluded that he "means as little as any rapper of consequence ever".

Rankings

Commercial performance
Whole Lotta Red debuted at number one on the US Billboard 200 with 100,000 album-equivalent units (including 10,000 pure album sales) in its first week. This became Carti's first US number-one debut and his second top 10 album. The album also accumulated a total of 126.43 million on-demand streams for its tracks, in the week ending December 31, 2020.

Track listing

Sample credits
 "Go2DaMoon" contains an uncredited sample from "Soul of Bobby Theme, Pt. 2", written by Laxmikant Shantaram Kudalkar and Pyarelal Ramprasad Sharma.
 "Stop Breathing" contains an uncredited interpolation from "Shirt Off", written by Radric Davis, Xavier Dotson, Nyquan Malphurs and Greg Hogan, and performed by Gucci Mane, Wooh da Kid and Frenchie.
 "Vamp Anthem" contains an uncredited sample from the Toccata and Fugue in D minor, attributed to Johann Sebastian Bach.
 "Control" features an uncredited vocal sample of DJ Akademiks.
 "F33l Lik3 Dyin" contains a sample from "iMi", written by Justin Vernon, James Blake, Rob Moose, Bradley Cook, Michael Lewis, Michael Noyce, Brandon Burton, Jeremy Nutzman, Channy Leaneagh, Wesley Glass and Josh Berg, as performed by Bon Iver.

Personnel
Credits adapted from the album's liner notes and Tidal.

 Kanye West – executive producer
 Matthew Williams – executive producer
 Marcus Fritz – mixer (all tracks), recording engineer (1–4, 6–9, 11, 12, 14–17, 19, 20, 22–24)
 Roark Bailey – mixer (all tracks), recording engineer (5, 7, 10, 13, 21)
 William J. Sullivan – mixer (6)
 Collin Leonard – mastering engineer
 Josh Berg – recording engineer (2)
 Liz Robson – recording engineer (18)
 Pi'erre Bourne – recording engineer (18)

Charts

Weekly charts

Year-end charts

Certifications

Release history

References

2020 albums
Playboi Carti albums
Mumble rap albums
Interscope Records albums
Albums produced by Pi'erre Bourne
Albums produced by Wheezy
Experimental music albums by American artists